Rodobaldo Díaz Arambarry (born 16 March 1942) is a Cuban former sprinter who competed in the 1968 Summer Olympics.

References

1942 births
Living people
Cuban male sprinters
Olympic athletes of Cuba
Athletes (track and field) at the 1967 Pan American Games
Athletes (track and field) at the 1968 Summer Olympics
Central American and Caribbean Games gold medalists for Cuba
Competitors at the 1970 Central American and Caribbean Games
Central American and Caribbean Games medalists in athletics
Pan American Games competitors for Cuba
20th-century Cuban people